Admiral Edmund Lyons, 1st Baron Lyons,  (21 November 179023 November 1858) was an eminent British Admiral of the Royal Navy, and diplomat, who ensured Britain's victory in the Crimean War, during which he was Commander-in-Chief of the Mediterranean Fleet, by his contribution at the Siege of Sevastopol (1854–1855) with both the Royal Navy and the British Army.

As a consequence of his 'intelligence and great ability', 'quiet humour', 'frankness and urbanity', and 'vigilance and practical skill', Lyons was appointed to ambassadorial positions in Sweden, and in Switzerland, and to the court of King Otto of Greece. 

Edmund's nephews included Sir Algernon Lyons, Admiral of the Fleet.

Family 

Edmund Lyons was born at Whitehayes House, Burton, near Christchurch, on 21 November 1790. He was the fourth son of Captain John Lyons, an owner of extensive sugar plantations in Antigua, whose British residence was at St. Austen's, Lymington, Hampshire, and Catherine (née Walrond), daughter of Maine Swete Walrond, 5th Marquis de Vallado. His brothers included Vice-Admiral John Lyons
(1787–1872), who was on board  at the Battle of Trafalgar and who served as British Ambassador in Egypt; Maine Walrond Lyons, (1798–1827), a lieutenant in the Royal Navy who was killed at Battle of Navarino; and Humphrey Lyons (1802–1873), a lieutenant-general in the Indian (Bombay) Army.

His nephews included Sir Algernon McLennan Lyons, Admiral of the Fleet (1833–1908), and Richard Lyons Pearson, Assistant Commissioner of the Metropolitan Police. His godparents were Sir Richard Hussey Bickerton and Lady Bickerton.

Naval and diplomatic service 

Lyons first went to sea on board HMS Terrible in 1798, when he was eight years old. He then returned to England to attend Hyde Abbey School near Winchester, which he attended until 1803, when he joined the Royal Navy and the crew of the frigate HMS Active, with which he remained for four years. He served at the passage of the Dardanelles, under Sir John Duckworth, in February 1807.

He was posted to the West Indies later in 1807 and commissioned as a lieutenant in 1809, as which he participated in the capture of Banda Neira, for which he was mentioned for gallantry and promoted. Lyons then served as a flag-lieutenant, to Rear-Admiral Drury, aboard HMS Minden (74 guns). In 1810, he served in the 18-gun sloop  notably at the capture, from the Dutch, on 9 August 1810, of Banda Neira in the Moluccas during the Invasion of the Spice Islands: Lyons was involved in the assault on Fort Belgica.

Lyons destroys Fort Marrack 

In 1811, a planned British attack on the fortified port of Fort Marrack, in the Sunda Strait of Batavia, Dutch East Indies, was postponed after the Royal Navy received intelligence that Dutch reinforcements had arrived. Lyons with only 34 men attacked the fort anyway and destroyed its 180-strong garrison and 54 guns. Lyons was on 25 July dispatched to land Dutch prisoners on the island. On his return journey, on 30 July, he decided to launch a surprise midnight attack on the Dutch fort with the 34 men who accompanied him. Lyons stormed and captured the Dutch battery, and dispersed its Dutch garrison of 180 men and two boat-crews, and gunned down the Dutch reinforcements as they arrived, and then dismantled the fort and destroyed its 54 guns with dynamite so that they could not be used on the British Fleet.

This action was praised by the Royal Navy as 'the most outstanding example of individual bravery in the wars which followed the French Revolution'. Lyons's Commander-in-Chief, Commodore Broughton, acknowledged Lyons's 'gallantry and zeal' but criticised Lyons because 'the attack was made contrary to orders'. but Lyons was nevertheless for this action mentioned in dispatches and proposed for early promotion to the rank of Commander, which he received on 21 March 1812.

Marriage and issue 
After his attack on Marrack, Lyons's health deteriorated and he returned to Britain. In 1814, he was promoted to captain and commanded the sloop  in the fleet that escorted the French King Louis XVIII and other allied sovereigns from England to France. On 18 July 1814, at Southwick, Hampshire, he married Augusta Louisa (1792–1852), daughter of Captain Josias Rogers of the navy. He was unemployed until 1828, whilst he and his wife had two sons and two daughters:

 Anne Theresa Bickerton Lyons (1815–1894), who married Philip Hartmann Veit von Würtzburg, Baron von Würtzburg, in Bavaria, in 1839.

 Richard Lyons, 1st Viscount Lyons (1817–1887). Eminent diplomat who served during the American Civil War, in which he solved the Trent affair, and who founded the Lyons School of Diplomacy. He was a favourite of Queen Victoria who stated that she would allow him to represent her 'at any court in the world'. Richard was granted the higher noble titles of Viscount (1881) and Earl (1887), but he died, unmarried and without issue, before he had formally received the latter.

 Edmund Moubray Lyons (1819–1855). Captain in the Royal Navy who was killed in the Crimean War and died without issue.

 Augusta Mary Minna Catherine Lyons (1821–1886), who married, in, 1839, Henry Granville Fitzalan-Howard, 14th Duke of Norfolk, and whose grandson was Philip Kerr, 11th Marquess of Lothian.

Early Mediterranean service 

Lieutenant Maine Walrond Lyons, one of Edmund Lyons's younger brothers, was killed at the Battle of Navarino in 1827. The Duke of Clarence, who was the heir presumptive to the British throne, subsequently appointed Edmund, in 1828, to command the 46-gun frigate  during the end of the Greek War of Independence. 

Lyons arrived in Malta on 20 May 1828, when Sir Richard Hussey Bickerton and Admiral Sausages described him, in letters to their Fleet Commander, as 'a man of intelligence and great ability'. Lyons and his wife rented the most expensive house in Valletta, where they home-schooled their four children in grammar and in Enlightenment philosophy.

On HMS Blonde, Lyons was involved in the capture of Kastro Morea in the Peloponnese, for which he was knighted in both France and Greece. The following year, Lyons took the Blonde to become the first British warship to visit Sevastopol, the Caucasus, and Odessa: as a consequence of which 25 years later, Lyons was the only senior officer involved in the Crimean War who had direct knowledge of the Black Sea. In 1831 Lyons was appointed to command of the frigate , which he brought home to England before he sailed it for the Mediterranean in February 1832.

Diplomat at Athens, Switzerland, and Sweden 
In August 1832, Lyons transported the new King Otto of Greece, and the Bavarian Regency, from Brindisi to Nauplia, and then, in 1833, from Trieste to Athens. Lyons left the navy in January 1835, was knighted in the Royal Guelphic Order, and was appointed by Lord Palmerston as the British diplomat at Athens, as which he remained for almost fifteen years, during which he was on 29 July 1840 created baronet, and in July 1844 he was made a Knight Grand Cross in the Civil Division of the Order of the Bath.

In 1849 Lyons was appointed Minister Plenipotentiary to the Confederated States of the Swiss Cantons and was on 14 January 1850 promoted to rear-admiral of the Royal Navy, and was in 1851 appointed minister at Stockholm, at which his wife died.

Second-in-command of Mediterranean Fleet 

In November 1853, with the advocacy of Sir James Graham, Lyons returned to active service in the Royal Navy, and was appointed second in command of the British Mediterranean Fleet, and was granted a pension of £900 per annum for his diplomatic service. Lyons left England for the Dardanelles, as Rear-Admiral of the White, on board the steam frigate HMS Terrible on 5 November 1853, before he then took command of his flagship, the new screw-steam ship-of-the-line  (91 guns).

Crimean War: maverick nature and private correspondences

Sir James Graham 

Lyons maintained secret private correspondence with the First Lord of the Admiralty, Sir James Graham, whose plans for an amphibious assault on Sevastopol Lyons advocated at the Allied Counsels of War between July and August 1854, despite the policy his immediate superior, Vice-Admiral Dundas.

Lyons also maintained direct private correspondences with various Cabinet ministers, and published memos to the British public, in The Times newspaper, through its reporters such as John Delane, and Austen Henry Layard, and William Howard Russell, in which he criticised the policies of Admiral Dundas, who disliked Lyons's wilful independence. However, Dundas's superiors within the Navy preferred Lyons, whom they considered to be the more competent and the more charismatic, and encouraged Lyons's independence, by private correspondence and plans, such as those for the assault on Sevastopol, of which officers between Sir James Graham and Lyons in rank, such as Dundas, were not aware. 

Both the English Fleet and the French Fleet zealously commended Lyons's 'skill and boldness' during the Crimean War. Lyons's white-blonde hair became identified with his maverick temerity. Lyons's hair was similar to the hair of Nelson, whom Lyons idolized. However, Lyons did not possess the strategic intelligence of Nelson and attained his victories, such as the destruction of Fort Marrack (see above) and the attack on Sevastopol (see below), by temerity rather than by meticulous planning. Lyons disliked paperwork: when Admiral Dundas ordered him to organize transports for the invasion of the Crimea, Lyons immediately employed a subordinate, his flag captain William Mends, to do it for him.

Lord Raglan and the army 

Furthermore, Lyons's charisma made him a favourite of the Army General Lord Raglan, with whom he maintained another private correspondence. The friendship between Lyons and Raglan was productive of an inter-service rapport during the Crimean War and Lyons served as an intermediary between the Navy and the Army. When Lyons captured Balaklava, he advised Raglan to adopt it as the base for the British Army: Raglan did so. However, this was a poor decision because it compelled the army to suffer the Crimean winter.

Although he was a Naval Commander, Lyons led a force during the diversionary attack on Sevastopol on 17 October 1854. Idiosyncratically, Lyons ignored Admiral Dundas's orders to remain disengaged and proceeded to attack on his own initiative: on this occasion, however, Lyons's attack was unsuccessful and the ships were damaged and heavy casualties sustained. However, although the attack failed, Lyons was praised for his bravery by the High Command. Lyons conceded that he was responsible for the failure, but the High Command blamed Dundas for the failure, dismissed Dundas, and, in January 1855, made Lyons Commander-in-Chief.

Lyons continued to work productively with Raglan to improve supply arrangements in the Bosphorus and at Balaklava. Lyons secured another diplomatic triumph when he secured, in May 1855, French consent to capture of Kerch and occupation of the Sea of Azov: this operation destroyed the logistic support of the Russian army in the Crimea and enabled the allied victory.

Later Crimean War 

In June 1855, Lyons lost both his own son, Edmund, a Captain in the Royal Navy, who had been wounded in a night attack on Sevastopol, and his friend and colleague Lord Raglan. Lyons after the defeat of Sevastopol led a successful expedition, which was the first military action to involve armoured warships, to capture Kinburn on 17 October 1855, which enabled access to the Bug and Dnieper rivers. In July 1855, Lyons, who had already received the honour of Knight Grand Cross of the Civil Division of the Order of the Bath, received the honour of Knight Grand Cross of the Military Division of the same order. He is one of few persons to have attained the rank of Knight Grand Cross in both divisions of the Order of the Bath. Lyons attended the January 1856 allied Council of War at Paris, and subsequent to the Treaty of Paris he relinquished his post of Commander in Chief of the Royal Navy in the Mediterranean, for which a Banquet was subsequently hosted for him at the Mansion House, London and he was awarded the Freedom of the City of London on 24 May 1856.

Lyons's contribution to the Crimean War was imperative to the allied success. He transported the British Army to the Crimea and he ensured its supplies and support by the military on land, where he led assaults, including the Kerch operation, and where his friendship with Lord Raglan enabled the coordination of the Royal Navy with the British Army and Navy.

Final years, death, and legacy 
Edmund Lyons was created a Baron, of Christchurch, on 23 June 1856. He entered the House of Lords between Admiral George Byron, 7th Baron Byron, and Thomas Foley, 4th Baron Foley. He was promoted to Vice-Admiral on 19 March 1857 and held the temporary rank of Admiral from December 1857 until his death. He escorted Queen Victoria to Cherbourg in August 1858. Lyons died, on 23 November 1858, at Arundel Castle, which was the seat of his son-in-law, Henry Granville Fitzalan-Howard, 14th Duke of Norfolk, where he is interred in the vault beneath the Fitzalan Chapel. 

There is a life-sized statue of him, by Matthew Noble, in St Paul's Cathedral, which remains there. The Edmund River and Lyons River in Australia are named after him.

Lyons's 'intelligence and great ability' and 'bravery, spirit, and commitment' earned him the loyalty of the officers and rank-and-file whom he commanded, and he was described as 'as lavish with his praise of others as he was anxious to be praised by his superiors'. His 1859 Obituary described him as 'affable, playful, and full of quiet humour', as having 'frankness and urbanity', as having 'inimitable' ability in 'graphic description', and as having 'vigilance and practical skill' with which he was 'prompt in expedients'. However, Edmund Lyons was described by a Foreign Secretary, George Villiers, 4th Earl of Clarendon as 'irritable and one of the vainest men I ever knew'.

Honours 

Lyons received the following honours:
 1828 – Knight of the Order of St Louis (France)
 1833 – Knight Grand Cross of the Order of the Redeemer (Greece)
 1835 – Knight Commander of the Royal Guelphic Order (House of Guelph)
 1840 – Baronet (United Kingdom)
 1844 – Knight Grand Cross of the Civil Division of the Order of the Bath (United Kingdom)
 1855 – Knight Grand Cross of the Military Division of the Order of the Bath (United Kingdom)
 Knight Grand Cross of the Order of St Michael and St George (United Kingdom)
 1855 – Knight Grand Cross of the Order of the Medjidie, 1st Class (Ottoman Empire)
 1855/6 – Knight Grand Cross of the Legion of Honour (France)
 1856 – Freedom of the City of London
 1856 – Grand Cross of the Military Order of Savoy (Italy)
 1856 – Raised to the Peerage of United Kingdom as Baron Lyons, of Christchurch, Hampshire, (United Kingdom).

See also 
 Lyons family

References

Further reading

External link

1790 births
1858 deaths
Barons in the Peerage of the United Kingdom
Diplomatic peers
Royal Navy personnel of the Napoleonic Wars
Knights Grand Cross of the Order of the Bath
Knights Grand Cross of the Order of St Michael and St George
Knights of the Order of Saint Louis
Recipients of the Order of the Medjidie, 1st class
Grand Croix of the Légion d'honneur
Knights Grand Cross of the Military Order of Savoy
People from Christchurch, Dorset
Royal Navy admirals
Royal Navy personnel of the Crimean War
Ambassadors of the United Kingdom to Greece
Ambassadors of the United Kingdom to Sweden
Ambassadors of the United Kingdom to Switzerland
History of Greece (1832–1862)
Peers of the United Kingdom created by Queen Victoria